Pirates & Privateers is a 1997 role-playing game supplement published by West End Games for Star Wars: The Roleplaying Game.

Contents
As the title implies, Pirates & Privateers is a supplement about both pirates and privateers sanctioned by a government or faction.

Reception
The reviewer from Pyramid #28 (Nov./Dec., 1997) stated that "I had heard good things about this book before I received it, and I have to say that the buzz on the streets was correct. The new Star Wars: Pirates & Privateers is a great book for many different kinds of campaigns. You might wonder why at first, but trust me it's worth a read if you are a Star Wars gamer."

Reviews
Arcane (Issue 18 - Apr 1997)

References

Role-playing game supplements introduced in 1997
Star Wars: The Roleplaying Game supplements